Cynnull-mawr is a small village in the  community of Ceulanamaesmawr, Ceredigion, Wales, which is 76.3 miles (122.8 km) from Cardiff and 176.9 miles (284.7 km) from London. Cynnull-mawr is represented in the Senedd by Elin Jones (Plaid Cymru) and is part of the Ceredigion constituency in the House of Commons.

Etymology
'Cynnull' is the Welsh word for "a gathering"; the word "mawr" means "great"; "a great gathering".

References

See also
List of localities in Wales by population

Villages in Ceredigion